The 2019 North Hertfordshire Council election was held on 2 May 2019, at the same time as other local elections across England and Northern Ireland. Of the 49 seats on North Hertfordshire District Council, 16 were up for election.

The Conservatives had a majority on the council prior to the election, but lost a net total of six seats, leaving the council under no overall control. The Conservative leader and leader of the council prior to the election was Lynda Needham, who lost her Letchworth South West seat after a tie with the Liberal Democrat candidate, Sean Prendergast, which was settled by drawing lots. Whilst the Conservatives remained the largest party, with six seats more than any other party, a Labour and Liberal Democrat coalition took control of the council after the election, with the Labour leader, Martin Stears-Handscomb, becoming leader of the council, and the Liberal Democrat leader, Paul Clark, becoming deputy leader of the council. David Levett became new leader of the Conservative group, which became the opposition.

Overall results

The overall results were as follows:

Ward Results
The results for each ward were as follows. Where the previous incumbent was standing for re-election they are marked with an asterisk(*).

The retiring councillor in Letchworth Grange ward, Paul Marment, had been elected as a Conservative in 2015, but defected to the Liberal Democrats in 2018.

As the result in Letchworth South West ward was a draw, the tied candidates drew lots to choose the winner.

Changes 2019–2021
Two councillors resigned in March 2020: Ben Lewis, Conservative councillor for Royston Palace, and Deepak Sangha, Labour councillor for Letchworth Wilbury. Due to the COVID-19 pandemic no by-election could be held. The vacancies were subsequently filled at the 2021 election, which would have been when Deepak Sangha's term of office would have expired anyway.

References 

North Hertfordshire District Council election
May 2019 events in the United Kingdom
2019
2010s in Hertfordshire
Election and referendum articles with incomplete results